Columba Blango (born 23 April 1956) is a Sierra Leonean–British politician and former athlete. He competed in the men's decathlon at the 1980 Summer Olympics.

He later moved to the United Kingdom and served as a Liberal Democrat councillor and Mayor of Southwark. He became the Liberal Democrat parliamentary candidate for Camberwell and Peckham, standing at the 2010 United Kingdom general election. He was able to achieve a 1.9% increase in votes from the previous year, ultimately winning 22.4% of the vote, but was defeated by Harriet Harman of the Labour Party. His son of the same name won a bronze medal at the 2020 Summer Paralympics.

References

External links
 

1956 births
Living people
Athletes (track and field) at the 1980 Summer Olympics
Sierra Leonean decathletes
Olympic athletes of Sierra Leone
Place of birth missing (living people)
Black British politicians
Liberal Democrats (UK) councillors